
A critical-list minor planet (critical list numbered object or critical object) is a numbered minor planet whose orbit and position is especially in need of improvement. 

The IAU's Minor Planet Center (MPC) regularly publishes a list of these critical objects in their Minor Planet Electronic Circular. The list typically contains asteroids that have been observed at a small number of apparitions, especially on opposition, or that have not been adequately observed for more than 10 years, while other observatories create their own, customized lists. The MPC also lists currently observable critical objects on their website, providing differently formatted lists of orbital elements to the worldwide astrometric community.

, the MPC includes more than a thousand objects in their critical list, half of them being either near-Earth asteroids or distant minor planets which account for 674 and 192 critical objects, respectively.

List 
The lowest numbered critical-list objects are:

 1915 Quetzálcoatl
 2135 Aristaeus
 3362 Khufu
 3753 Cruithne
 (4688) 1980 WF
 5335 Damocles
 (5590) 1990 VA
 7066 Nessus
 (8014) 1990 MF
 10370 Hylonome
 14827 Hypnos
 
 (15789) 1993 SC
 
 (15809) 1994 JS
 
 
 
 
 19521 Chaos
 
 
 
 20461 Dioretsa

See also 
 Distant minor planet
 Lost minor planet
 Unusual minor planet

References

External links 
 MPEC 1998-G21 : CRITICAL-LIST MINOR PLANETS, Minor Planet Circular (1998)
 Asteroid orbit determination using Bayesian probabilities, Karri Muinonen, Edward Bowell (1993)

Minor planets